The 1997 Ohio State Buckeyes football team represented the Ohio State University in the 1997 Big Ten Conference football season. The Buckeyes compiled a 10–3 record, including the 1998 Sugar Bowl in New Orleans, Louisiana, where they lost 31–14 to the Florida State Seminoles.

Schedule

Roster

Coaching staff 
 John Cooper – Head Coach – 10th year
 Bill Conley – Recruiting Coordinator (11th year)
 Jim Heacock – Defensive Line (2nd year)
 Mike Jacobs – Offensive Coordinator (3rd year)
 Fred Pagac – Defensive Coordinator (16th year)
 Tim Salem – (1st year)
 Shawn Simms – Defensive Ends (1st year)
 Tim Spencer – Running Backs (4th year)
 Chuck Strobart – Offensive Coordinator (3rd year)
 Jon Tenuta – Defensive Backs (2nd year)

Game summaries

Wyoming

Bowling Green

Arizona

Missouri

Iowa

Penn State

Indiana

Northwestern

Michigan State

Minnesota

Illinois

Michigan

1998 Sugar Bowl

Rankings

NFL draft 
For the first time since the NFL draft's inception in 1936, no Ohio State players were selected in the 1998 NFL Draft.

References

Ohio State
Ohio State Buckeyes football seasons
Ohio State Buckeyes football